Asarta aethiopella is a species of snout moth in the genus Asarta. It was described by Philogène Auguste Joseph Duponchel in 1837. It is found in France, Spain, Switzerland, Italy, Germany, Austria, Slovakia, Bosnia and Herzegovina, Albania, North Macedonia, Bulgaria, Romania, Ukraine and Russia.

The wingspan is 14–16 mm.

References

Moths described in 1837
Phycitini
Moths of Europe